Joy Parr  (born 1949) is a Canadian historian. Parr is a professor at the University of Western Ontario and holds a Tier 1 Canada Research Chair in Technology, Culture and Risk. She is known for her work in the fields of labour and gender history as well as the history of technology.

Career and honours 
Parr received her Bachelor of Arts degree from McGill University in 1971 before moving on to graduate school at Yale University, where she received her PhD in 1977. She has taught at several institutions in both Canada and the United States, including Yale, Queen's University, the University of British Columbia, and Simon Fraser University.

Parr has won numerous awards and distinctions over the course of her career. She was elected a Fellow of the Royal Society of Canada in 1992, and in 2000 became the first woman to win the Society's prestigious J. B. Tyrell Historical Medal for outstanding work in the history of Canada. She was the recipient of the 1991 Sir John A. Macdonald Prize (now the CHA Best Scholarly Book in Canadian History Prize) for the best book in Canadian history from the Canadian Historical Association for her book The Gender of Breadwinners, which also won the Association's 1995 François-Xavier Garneau Medal. Her 2010 book Sensing Changes was awarded both the Canada Prize from the Canadian Federation for the Humanities and Social Sciences and the Edelstein Prize from the Society for the History of Technology (SHOT). In 2018, SHOT awarded Parr the Leonardo da Vinci Medal for lifetime achievement, noting that "Parr has played an important role in redefining the field of history of technology internationally, in inspiring a younger generation to engage with the field, and in building a vibrant community in Canada and beyond." Parr is also the namesake for the Joy Parr Envirotech Travel Award from SHOT.

Selected works

References

External links 
 Departmental page, UWO
 Joy Parr's homepage
 Mega Projects New Media

1949 births
Living people
20th-century Canadian historians
21st-century Canadian historians
Canadian women historians
Fellows of the Royal Society of Canada
Historians of technology
Labor historians
McGill University alumni
Academic staff of Queen's University at Kingston
Academic staff of the University of British Columbia
Academic staff of the University of Western Ontario
Writers from Toronto
Yale University alumni
Yale University faculty
20th-century Canadian women writers